Two Eyes is the third studio album by the American singer/songwriter Brenda Russell, released in 1983 on Warner Bros. Records. The album got to No. 16 on the Blues & Soul Top British Soul Albums chart.

Overview
Artists such as Michael McDonald, Rita Coolidge, Stevie Wonder, Pattie Brooks, Randy Crawford, Christopher Cross, James Ingram, Patrice Rushen and Al Jarreau appeared on the album.

In 1990, singer Lalah Hathaway covered the song "It's Something" under the title "Somethin'" on her self-titled debut album. Later in 2013 Lalah Hathaway with Snarky Puppy did another rendition of the song for the album 'Family Dinner - Volume 1', which on January 26, 2014, won a Grammy Award in the "Best R&B Performance" category.

Track listing
 "I Want Love To Find Me" (Brenda Russell, Bill LaBounty) – 3:02
 "It's Something" (Brenda Russell, David Foster) – 3:31
 "Hello People" (Brenda Russell, Michael McDonald) – 3:24
 "Two Eyes" (Brenda Russell) – 3:16
 "Stay Close" (Brenda Russell, Don Grusin) – 4:25
 "Jarreau" (Brenda Russell) – 3:13
 "New York Bars" (Brenda Russell) – 4:04
 "I'll See You Again" (Brenda Russell) – 4:20
 "Look Down, Young Soldier" (Brenda Russell) – 4:40

Personnel 
 Brenda Russell – lead vocals, backing vocals (1-4, 6-9), vocal arrangements, rhythm arrangements (2, 3, 4, 6-9), acoustic piano (6, 8, 9)
 Bill LaBounty – acoustic piano (1)
 Leon Pendarvis – Fender Rhodes (1, 4, 6-9), rhythm arrangements (1, 4, 6-9)
 James Newton Howard – synthesizers (1, 3-8), synthesizer arrangements (1, 4-8), LinnDrum (3), rhythm arrangements (3)
 Robbie Buchanan – additional synthesizers (1, 6, 7)
 David Foster – acoustic piano (2), synthesizers (2), rhythm arrangements (2), synthesizer arrangements (2)
 Michael McDonald – Fender Rhodes (3), synthesizers (3), LinnDrum (3), rhythm arrangements (3)
 Don Grusin – Fender Rhodes (5), additional synthesizers (5), rhythm arrangements (5)
 David Williams – electric guitar (3, 4-7, 9)
 Dean Parks – electric guitar (6)
 Caleb Quaye – electric guitar (8)
 Nathan East – bass 
 John Robinson – drums
 Jeff Porcaro – tambourine (3)
 Paulinho da Costa – percussion (4, 7, 8, 9)
 Kim Hutchcroft – alto saxophone (1), tenor saxophone (6, 7), flute (9), piccolo flute (9)
 Larry Williams – tenor saxophone (1, 6, 7), horn arrangements (1, 6, 7, 9), flute (9), piccolo flute (9)
 Bill Reichenbach Jr. – trombone (1, 6, 7), bass trombone (9), baritone (9), tuba (9)
 Gary Grant – trumpet (1, 7)
 Jerry Hey – trumpet (1, 6, 7)
 Stevie Wonder – harmonica (8)
 Pattie Brooks, Rita Coolidge, Randy Crawford, Christopher Cross, Joe Esposito, Donny Gerrard, James Ingram, Al Jarreau, Bill LaBounty, David Lasley, Michael McDonald, Caleb Quayle, Patrice Rushen, Cinnamon Sharpe and Leon Ware – backing vocals on "Look Down, Young Soldier"

Production 
 Producer – Tommy LiPuma
 Executive Producers – David Nathan and Paul Tarnopol
 Recorded and Mixed by Al Schmitt
 Assistant Engineers – Bob Bullock, Terry Christian, Don Koldon, Peggy McCreary and Steve Schmitt.
 Mastered by Mike Reese at The Mastering Lab (Hollywood, California).
 Creative Director – Rich Kamerman
 Art Direction – Simon Levy 
 Cover Design – Laura LiPuma
 Photography – Paddy Reynolds

Charts

References

Brenda Russell albums
1983 albums
Albums produced by Tommy LiPuma
Warner Records albums